Leucosyrinx exulans is a species of sea snail, a marine gastropod mollusk in the family Pseudomelatomidae, the turrids and allies.

Description
The length of the shell attains 32 mm, its diameter 13 mm.

(Original description) The solid shell has a yellowish chocolate-brown color. It is strongly sculptured, with eight or nine whorls. The tip is eroded in all the specimens. The whorls are rounded. The region of the fasciole in front of the closely appressed suture is flattish, constricted, and polished. The transverse sculpture in front of the fasciole (on the penultimate whorl) consists of about fourteen short, stout, obliquely set riblets, which coronate the whorl and do not reach the suture in front. The spiral sculpture consists of rather narrow shallow grooves, separating slightly raised flattish, rather wider, threads.  The last are finest on the fasciole and somewhat coarser near the siphonal canal, but tolerably uniform over the entire surface. The notch is rather wide, not very deep, rounded, and half way between the suture and the posterior ends of the peripheral riblets. The outer lip is thin, simple and produced in the middle. The siphonal canal is rather well defined and not very long. The columella is obliquely trimmed off in front, of a creamy brown, with a thin polished glaze. The axis is not pervious. The siphonal canal is rather deep, flaring a little anteriorly.

Distribution
This marine species occurs off the Galapagos Islands.

References

External links
 

exulans
Gastropods described in 1890